The Chasseral is a mountain of the Jura Mountains, overlooking Lake Biel in the Swiss canton of Bern. With an elevation of 1,606 metres above sea level, the Chasseral is the highest summit in the canton of Bern outside the Alps. It is also both the northernmost and easternmost mountain reaching over 1,500 metres in the Jura Mountains. West of the summit is located the Chasseral Ouest (1,552 m), where runs the border with the canton of Neuchâtel. The Chasseral Pass is located further on the west.

The Chasseral is the fourth most topographically isolated mountain of Switzerland, although it is the first when considering only easily accessible summits. This results in a very extensive view over the other mountains of the Jura, the Swiss Plateau, the Alps, the Vosges and the Black Forest. The summit can be reached from the Chasseral hotel, where there is a bus stop.

Climate

See also
 List of mountains of Switzerland
 List of mountains of Switzerland accessible by public transport
 Nature parks in Switzerland

References

External links
Chasseral on Hikr
Swisscom tower

Mountains of Switzerland
Mountains of the Jura
Mountains of the canton of Bern
One-thousanders of Switzerland